Vasile Paraschiv (April 3, 1928 – February 4, 2011) was a Romanian social and political activist.

Biography 
Paraschiv was born in Ordoreanu village, Clinceni commune, Ilfov County. After 1940, he worked in Bucharest and after 1947 he worked for the Romanian Communist Party, Romanian Post (December 1947 – November 1949).

He was member of the Romanian Communist Party (November 1946 – November 1968). After his resignation from Romanian Communist Party, he was arrested. From the end of the 1960s until the Communism's fall, he was a victim of psychiatric repression.

He had tried to set up a trade union but was kidnapped and tortured three times by the Securitate (secret police) which attempted to portray him as mentally disturbed.

Also, Paraschiv was a collaborator of Paul Goma. In 2002, Paul Goma wrote an article which includes a letter and Paraschiv's list of communist activists that persecuted him during communism.

Paraschiv died in 2011 from heart failure. He refused to be decorated by President Traian Băsescu, whom he labelled "a former communist".

Works 
 Vasile Paraschiv, Lupta mea pentru sindicate libere in Romania. Terorismul politic organizat de statul communist (Iasi, 2005)
 Vasile Paraschiv, Asa nu se mai poate, tovarase Nicolae Ceausescu! (Bucharest: Curtea Veche, 2007).

Footnotes

External links 

 http://www.ziua.net/news.php?data=2008-07-10&id=9127

1928 births
2011 deaths
Romanian activists
Romanian civil servants
Romanian human rights activists
Romanian philanthropists
Romanian textbook writers
Romanian prisoners and detainees
Romanian torture victims
People from Ilfov County
Political writers
Romanian dissidents
Romanian communists